Đurđekovec is a settlement in the City of Zagreb, Croatia, population 778 (2011). It is located around 9 km north-east of the city centre of Zagreb and adjacent to the Medvednica mountain.

References

Populated places in the City of Zagreb